South Korea has traditional sports of its own, as well as sports from different cultures and countries.

Sports originating from Korea
Taekwondo, a popular martial sport is often claimed to have historical origins on the Korean peninsula with origins said to have been traced as far back as the 1st century BCE. However, such historical claims are difficult to empirically verify and separate from the influences of neighboring counties. The sport rose to prominence following the end of Japanese occupation with the end of WWII. Formalized rules were established in 1961 and in 1988 the sport became an Olympic event. The name "Taekwondo" literally means way of foot and fist, although the modern emphasis lies on the kicks. This may be a way to help legitimize the sport's connection to the traditional practice called Taekkyon, which originated in Korea during the Goguryeo period in the 4th century. Taekkyon uses hands and feet as well as any part of the body; though only open feet and open hands are allowed during competitions. The motions are smoother and more curvilinear than in Taekwondo. Although both disciplines start with the sound "tae" in English, there is no relationship.

Although there is much controversy regarding the historical origins of many martial disciplines in South Korea, there is little question that, Koreanized or traditional in origin, Korean martial arts and sports have enjoyed considerable success. Styles such as Hapkido, Kuk Sool, Hwarangdo, Han Moo Do, Yudo, Kumdo, Goog-sool, and many others arose quickly out of an independent Korea and have spread to countries around the world. Although they are not as popular as Taekwondo, they each uniquely represent the Korean martial spirit which dates back to antiquity. Unlike Japanese martial arts which often use "-do" at a name's end (meaning "way"), traditional Korean martial arts were called "Mu Sool" or "Mu Yea". This could lead to some confusion since although the "do" in Taekwondo and Hapkido means "way" (as in Karate-do and Aikido), the historical meaning in Hwarangdo is different from the modern usage (also "way" like the others). When that martial art was invented in the 1960s, the name was borrowed from an ancient group (do) consisting mainly of the children of the gentry class (yangban) for learning military tactics, leadership, and fighting skills.

Popular sports
Football and Baseball have traditionally been regarded as the most popular sports in Korea. A 2021 poll showed that a plurality of 25% of South Korean sports fans identified football as their favorite sport, with baseball ranked 2nd at 18.8% of respondents. However, the polling did not indicate the extent to which respondents follow both sports.

Baseball

Baseball was introduced in 1905 by American missionaries. The American missionaries' goal was to use Baseball to spread muscular Christianity. Professional baseball league, KBO League started in 1982 with 6 teams, now 10 teams. Korea won the Gold Medal in baseball at the 2008 Olympic Games. Korea is also a regular participant in the World Baseball Classic, and runner-up in 2009 and 3th in 2006. Korea is considered one of the best baseball countries in international competition. Several Korean players have gone on to play in Major League Baseball.  The domestic KBO League consistently draws 8 million total fans per year, averaging approximately 11,500 spectators per game, both highest among professional spectator sports in South Korea. There is also an active baseball cheering culture in South Korea, with each team having its own method of cheering.

Association football

In the early 1900s, football became an integral piece of Korean nationalism. It also became a symbol for the rivalry between Pyongyang and Gyungsung (Seoul) at the time. The people of Pyungyang used it to demonstrate their modernity and to resist the centralizing power of Gyungsung.

The national football team became the first team in the Asian Football Confederation to reach the FIFA World Cup semi-finals in the 2002 FIFA World Cup, jointly hosted by South Korea and Japan. The Korea Republic national team (as it is known) has qualified for every World Cup since Mexico 1986, and has broken out of the group stage thrice: first in 2002, then in 2010, when it was defeated by eventual semi-finalist Uruguay in the Round of 16, and in 2022, where it was defeated by eventual quarter-finalist Brazil. At the 2012 Summer Olympics, South Korea won the Bronze Medal for football.

South Korea, which competes internationally under the name of "Korea Republic", has qualified for eleven FIFA World Cups including the most recent 2022 tournament (Asian record), and co-hosted the 2002 World Cup, finishing in 4th place. Also in 2010, the country's under-17 women's team won the 2010 FIFA U-17 Women's World Cup in Trinidad and Tobago, claiming South Korea's first-ever title in worldwide FIFA competition. The K-League is the oldest domestic professional football league in Asia. A huge number of tiny amateur football gatherings are active and immensely popular.

Ice skating
Ice skating is also a very popular sport which sees kids even as young as 5 years old starting to compete and getting private coaching on a daily basis.  National leadership deliberately focused on short-track speed skating as an area of focus to do well in the Olympics and thus encouraged a culture of skating. The sport was first introduced to the country in 1982 by a Japanese university team who competed in an exhibition event, and the South Korean national team was established three years later, in time for the 1986 Asian Winter Games. By the first half of the 1990s they had become a major power in the sport, with Kim Ki-hoon becoming the country's first Winter Olympic gold medalist at the 1992 Winter Games in the men's 1000 metres, and the team winning five golds and a silver at the 1994 Winter Olympics.

Archery
South Korea has dominated archery at the international level, having the most medals in the Olympic Games of any country in the world as well as consistently strong performances in other international competitions.

Esports
Esports have found a strong home in South Korea, StarCraft professional competition being the largest example of these. Major corporate sponsored teams and leagues have formed in esports, the most notable leagues being the OnGameNet Starleague, the MBCGame StarCraft League (retired), and Proleague. Some television stations are devoted to broadcasting electronic sports, such as Ongamenet, GomTV, and formerly MBCGame. The Korean e-Sports Association, an arm of the Ministry of Culture, Sports and Tourism, was founded in 2000 to promote and regulate esports in the country.

Basketball
Another sport gaining popularity in South Korea is basketball. Professional basketball teams compete in the Korean Basketball League. The South Korea national basketball team won a record number of 25 medals at the Asian Basketball Championship. The only Korean NBA player to date has been Ha Seung-Jin, who played there from 2004-06. Basketball was the most popular sport in South Korea in the 1990s along with baseball,  but its popularity has declined since the 2000s. In a 2022 ESPN story on Lee Hyun-jung, at the time starring in NCAA Division I basketball at Davidson College, a writer for Korean basketball magazine Jumpball commented, "In terms of popularity in Korea, if baseball and soccer are like BTS, then basketball is like '90s hair metal."

Volleyball
Volleyball is very popular in South Korea with the V-League being a professional league with men's and women's teams.

Fencing
In recent years, South Korea has performed well in fencing, winning many medals from recent Olympic Games and World Championships.

Korean martial arts

Taekwondo is the most practiced martial art in the country and is very popular outside of South Korea.

Lacrosse
The South Korea national lacrosse team has qualified for the World Lacrosse Championship five consecutive times (2002 to 2018).

South Korea has sent national teams to the Under-19 World Lacrosse Championships.

Golf
Golf is very popular in South Korea. It is often thought that this is linked to the fact that golf is considered a status symbol. Membership in golf clubs in South Korea is considerably more expensive than in Japan or the US.

Yang Yong-eun won the 2009 PGA Championship, the first Asian player to win a men's major tournament. K. J. Choi won eight PGA Tour events, including the 2011 Players Championship, and also claimed two top 5s at the Masters Tournament. Yang and Choi were selected for the Presidents Cup international team multiple times.

South Korea is especially strong in women's golf; 47 Koreans play on the world's leading women's tour, the LPGA Tour. Notable players include Pak Se-ri, who won five major tournaments from 1998 to 2006 and 25 LPGA Tour events; Inbee Park, who has won seven major tournaments since 2008 and 21 LPGA Tour events; and Jiyai Shin, Ryu So-yeon, Chun In-gee, Park Sung-hyun and Ko Jin-young, who have won two major tournaments each.

The two professional tours are the Korean Tour for men and the LPGA of Korea Tour for women.

Handball
The South Korea women's national handball team is one of two non-European countries to have won the World Championship and the only one to have captured Olympic gold.

Rugby union
Rugby union is played to some degree in South Korea, with the Korean team being currently ranked 31st in the world (as of December 2021) in the current IRB world rankings. Korea has been participating in the Asia Rugby Championship since 1969, with 5 total first-place finishes. In the two most recent Asia Rugby Championships (2018 and 2019), South Korea has finished both times as the runner-up. Most of South Korea's national rugby team players play their club rugby in Japan as South Korea doesn't have a professional league. The national rugby sevens side finished third in the Asian qualifier for the 2016 Summer Olympics, reaching the final qualifying tournament, but was unable to proceed past first-round group play in the final qualifier.

Kabaddi
Kabaddi is a growing sport in South Korea, with the South Korea national kabaddi team ranked 3rd in the world. Nine Korean players are playing in the Pro Kabaddi league in India.

Korean captain Jang Kun Lee is the most famous international player in the Pro Kabaddi league in India and is currently playing for the Bengal Warriors.

In the 2016 Kabaddi World cup, Korea finished in 3rd place in the tournament, as they lost to Iran in the semi-finals. Korea was the only team to beat the eventual winners and world champions India in the tournament. Korea was also invited to participate in the 2018 Dubai Kabaddi Masters as being among the top 4 Kabaddi playing nations in the world.now in the year 2022 Jang Kun Lee's younger brother is playing in Indian pro kabbadi league

Cricket
Cricket is not that common, but South Korea did enter a national team during the 2014 Asian Games which saw them beat the People's Republic of China. Cricket is mostly played by expats and a league only exists in Seoul and the surrounding suburbs; the side for the Asian Games, which could only draw from South Korean citizens, consisted partially of converted baseball players.

Table tennis
Table tennis is popular in South Korea. There are minor leagues in many universities.

Motorsport
South Korea hosted the annual Formula One Korean Grand Prix in Yeongam from 2010 until 2013.  However, South Korea has yet to have a driver on the grid.

On 30 November 2018, Formula E CEO, Alejandro Agag signed an agreement with Moon Jae-sik, chairman of JSM Holdings. South Korea was given the right to hold the Seoul ePrix from 2020 to 2025. It will be first ePrix in South Korea and third Asian country hosting after Hong Kong and China (Beijing and Sanya).

Ice hockey
Ice hockey is slowly emerging as a sport in South Korea, indicated by Anyang city seeing sell-out games for the Anyang Halla hockey club, which became the first non-Japanese club to win the championship title for Asia League Ice Hockey. South Korea has 4 teams participating in the Asia League Ice Hockey championship.

Other sports
Popular throughout Asia, Badminton is played by many Koreans. Badminton nets can be found in many outdoor recreation parks. Korean players often reach the finals in regional and world championships. Bowling is a popular sport in South Korea, with many local leagues. Computerized systems are commonplace.

Hiking on Korea's many mountains is very popular, particularly among older generations. Hiking is a massive industry for clothing companies and for tourism. Hence hiking trails in South Korea have good infrastructure.

Scuba diving is popular on Jeju island.

Fishing is a popular activity to do in streams, rivers, and the oceans. There are arranged fishing tours.

Korea's alpine skiing slopes were made known during the 2018 Winter Olympics in PyeongChang. Snowboarding was not allowed in most resorts until recently.

Major sport events

Summer Olympics

The 1988 Summer Olympics were celebrated in Seoul from September 17 to October 2, 1988. They were the second Summer Olympic Games to be held in Asia, last hosted in Tokyo in  1964.

At the Seoul Games, 160 nations were represented by 8391 athletes: 6197 men and 2194 women. 237 events were held. 27221 volunteers helped to prepare the Olympics. 11331 media (4978 written press and 6353 broadcasters) showed the Games all over the world.

These were the last Olympic Games for two of the world's "dominating" sport powers, Soviet Union and East Germany, as both ceased to exist by the next Olympic Games.

North Korea, still officially at war with South Korea, and its allies, Albania, Cuba, Madagascar and Seychelles boycotted the games. For differing reasons, Ethiopia, Nicaragua, and Albania (who declared an Olympic-record fourth consecutive boycott) did not participate in the Games. However, the much larger boycotts seen in the previous three Summer Olympics were avoided, resulting in the largest ever number of participating nations to that date.

North Korea and South Korea marched together in the 2000 and 2004 Olympics, and were thought likely to do so in 2008, however they did not. (See Sports in North Korea.)

South Korea has the distinction amongst Asian countries of collecting more Winter Olympics medals with 45 medals: 23 gold, 14 silver, and 8 bronze. South Korea ranked second in the 2016 Winter Youth Olympics medal table with ten gold medals. But, if they lost the title they followed up with a silver medal.

The 2018 Winter Olympics took place in Pyeongchang between 9 and 25 February 2018. Pyeongchang won on its third consecutive bid. After a series of large cities (Nagano to Sochi), for the first time since Lillehammer 1994 the Winter Olympics returned to a mountain resort.

FIFA World Cup

The 2002 FIFA World Cup was held in Korea and Japan with extreme success. More than 10
million Koreans came to the streets to support their team in the semifinals against Germany.

The 2002 FIFA World Cup was the 17th staging of the FIFA World Cup, held in South Korea and Japan from 31 May to 30 June. It was also the first World Cup held in Asia, and the last in which the golden goal rule was implemented. Brazil won the tournament for a record fifth time, beating Germany 2–0 in the final. Turkey beat South Korea 3–2 in the third place match.

Korea professional sports

International Championship Host

References